Siah Piran may refer to:
 Siah Piran-e Kashani
 Siah Piran-e Kasmai